Roy Zu-Arets (Hebrew: רועי זו-ארץ, born January 22, 1969) is an American-Israeli composer, pianist, music producer, and arranger.

Biography 

Roy Zu-Arets grew up in Tel Aviv, Israel. He was classically trained from the age of 3, and between the ages 5 and 18 he studied at the Israeli Music Conservatory in Tel Aviv. Zu-Arets developed an interest in contemporary classical music, pop, and rock in his teens and released his first album at 12 years old.

During the early 1990s, Zu-Arets scored music for various Israeli TV series, theater productions, and movies. He also played with and produced music for many Israeli musicians including Rita, Danny Sanderson, Uzi Hitman, Meir Banai, and HaYehudim.

In the late 1990s Zu-Arets moved to New York and studied music composition and theory at Juilliard School and later at Mannes College. In addition to his academic studies, Zu-Arets wrote music for theater and recorded with various artists including Taking Back Sunday and Omar Hakim.

In 2007 Zu-Arets played as a keyboardist in the Kaveret U.S. tour.

In 2009 Zu-Arets scored the music for the movie MacHEADS, released three albums, and started documenting his composition process and publishing it to his YouTube channel.

He now lives in Los Angeles.

Discography 
 Snowflakes - Piano Holiday Classics (2009)
 Confessions of a Composer (2009)
 Emanuel (2009)
 New York Analogue Ensemble (2004)
 Roy Zu-Arets (1980)

Compositions

Chamber music 
The Zrazuvian Colour, a piece calling for a marimba and four cellos. Premiered at The 12th Jerusalem International Chamber Music Festival in September 2009 and performed by Asaf Roth, Frans Helmerson, Nicolas Altstaedt, Kyril Zlotnikov and Zvi Plesser.

Music for film 
 MacHEADS (2009)
 1906 (2007)
 Connecting Dots (2003)

Music for theatre 
 One Hundred Gates, Jewish Theater of New York off-Broadway production featuring Elliott Gould
 The American Jew, Jewish Theater of New York off-Broadway production
 Bridges and Harmonies, off-Broadway production
 In the Realm of Chelm, Juilliard School of Drama (2004)

Other recorded appearances 
Where You Want to Be by Taking Back Sunday (2004) - piano, keyboard, string arrangement, conducting
The Wandering Tune by Meir Banai (1996) - piano, keyboard
Metziut Nifredet by HaYehudim (1995) - music production, piano
Mithch Tochi by Uzi Hitman (1993) - piano, arrangement

References

External links 
 Roy Zu-Arets's YouTube Channel
 Roy Zu-Arets's Albums
 

1969 births
Living people
20th-century classical composers
21st-century classical composers
Israeli composers
Israeli keyboardists
21st-century American composers
American male classical composers
American classical composers
20th-century American composers
20th-century American male musicians
21st-century American male musicians